G. V. Narayana Rao (born 9 Sept 1953) is a Telugu actor, producer. He started his acting career with 1976 film Anthuleni Katha directed by K. Balachander. He received Nandi Award as a best supporting actor for this film. He also received special jury award for Oka Oori Katha. He acted in nearly 40 films as a leading actor, and also produced 4 films.

Career 
When he was training in a film institute, Rajinikanth was his batch mate. He produced the films Devanthakudu, Yamudiki Mogudu.

Filmography
 Anthuleni Katha (1976)
 Muthyala Pallaki (1976)
 Oka Oori Katha (1977)
 Chilakamma Cheppindi (1977)
 Aalu Magalu (1977)
 Guppedu Manasu (1979)
 Kukka kaatuku cheppu debba (1979)
 Oorukichchina Maata (1981)
 Chattaniki Kallu Levu (1981)
 Manchu Pallaki (1982)
 Bahudoorapu Batasari (1983)
 Devanthakudu (1984)
 Premayanam (1988)
 Yamudiki Mogudu (1988)
 Raja Vikramarka (1990)
 Seetharamaiah Gari Manavaralu (1991)
 Gang Leader (1991)
 Prema Chitram Pelli Vichitram (1993)
 Hitler (1997)
 Sahasam (2013)
 Maha bhakta Siriyala (2014)
 Raju gari gadi 2 (2017)
 Tholu Bommalata (2019)
 Skylab (2021)

TV series
 Pasupu Kumkuma (Zee Telugu)
Sundarakanda (Gemini TV)
 Girija Kalyanam (Gemini TV)
 Geethanjali (Gemini TV)

References 

1953 births
Living people
Indian film producers
Telugu male actors